The Arboretum de la Sivrite is a research arboretum located within the Forêt de Haye near Vandœuvre-lès-Nancy, Meurthe-et-Moselle, Lorraine, France.

See also 
 List of botanical gardens in France

References

Further reading 
 Jean-François Lacaze and J. Pardé, "Les Enseignements de l'arboretum de la Sivrite", Revue Forestière Française, 15(2), pages 92-115, 1963.
 H. Polge, "Compte-rendu des études technologiques faites sur quatre essences en provenance de l'Arboretum de la Sivrite", Revue Forestière Française, n° 2, pages 116–126, February, 1963.

Sivrite, Arboretum de la
Sivrite, Arboretum de la